Trichopeltella is a genus of fungi in the Microthyriaceae family; according to the 2007 Outline of Ascomycota, the placement in this family is uncertain. This is a monotypic genus, containing the single species Trichopeltella montana.

References

External links
Index Fungorum

Microthyriales
Monotypic Dothideomycetes genera